Lothair II may refer to:
Lothair II of Lotharingia, who was the second Lothair to rule from Aachen
Lothair II of Italy, who was the second Lothair to rule Italy
Lothair II, Holy Roman Emperor, who was the second Emperor Lothair
Lothair II of France, who was the second Lothair to rule from West Francia